Palashban is a census town in the Andal CD block in the Durgapur subdivision of the Paschim Bardhaman district in the Indian state of West Bengal.

Geography

Location

Urbanisation
According to the 2011 census, 79.22% of the population of Durgapur subdivision was urban and 20.78% was rural. Durgapur subdivision has 1 municipal corporation at Durgapur and 38 (+1 partly) census towns  (partly presented in the map alongside; all places marked on the map are linked in the full-screen map).

Andal, a part of Andal (gram), Dignala, Palashban and Baska lying south of National Highway 19 (old numbering NH 2)/ Grand Trunk Road form a cluster of census towns. This cluster is linked to a cluster of census towns located north of NH 19.

Demographics
According to the 2011 Census of India, Palashban had a total population of 4,811, of which 2,531 (53%) were males and 2,280 (47%) were females. Population in the age group 0–6 years was 478. The total number of literate persons in Palashban was 3,580 (82.62% of the population over 6 years).

*For language details see Andal (community development block)#Language and religion

 India census, Palashban had a population of 4,856. Males constitute 53% of the population and females 47%. Palashban has an average literacy rate of 75%, higher than the national average of 59.5%: male literacy is 84%, and female literacy is 66%. In Palashban, 10% of the population is under 6 years of age.

Infrastructure

According to the District Census Handbook 2011, Bardhaman, Palashban covered an area of 2.83 km2. Among the civic amenities, the protected water-supply involved service reservoir, tube well, borewell. It had 384 domestic electric connections and 27 road lighting (points). Among the medical facilities, it had 1 hospital, 1 charitable hospital/ nursing home, 7 medicine shops. Among the educational facilities it had was 1 primary school, the other school facilities were available at Andal located nearby. Among the important commodities it produced were bricks.

Economy
It is in the heart of the coal mining zone.

Education
Palashban has three primary and one higher secondary schools.

Rahmatnagar Iqbal Academy is an Urdu-medium coeducational institution established in 1978. It has facilities for teaching from class V to class XII. The school has 15 computers, a library with 1,000 books and a playground.

Madanpur Mahesh Vidyamandir is a Bengali-medium coeducational institution established in 1957. It has facilities for teaching from class V to class X.

References

Cities and towns in Paschim Bardhaman district